Wola Krakowiańska  is a village in the administrative district of Gmina Nadarzyn, within Pruszków County, Masovian Voivodeship, in east-central Poland.

References

Villages in Pruszków County